Monger may refer to:

Traders
 Peddler, a travelling vendor of goods
 a merchant dealer, such as:
 Costermonger, a street seller of fruit and vegetables; in Britain also general (synonym) peddler
 Cheesemonger, a specialist seller of cheeses
 Fishmonger, a wholesaler or retailer of raw fish and seafood
 Ironmonger, a supplier of iron goods, or in the modern sense a hardware store

Other uses
 Monger (surname)
 Lake Monger, a large urban wetland in Perth, Western Australia
 Monger Lake, a watershed of the Ha! Ha! River in Quebec
 Mongers Lake, a lakes in Western Australia

See also

 Fearmongering, spreading of frightening rumours to purposely arouse fear
 Warmonger (disambiguation)